Assignment to Kill is a 1968 American drama film directed by Sheldon Reynolds and starring Patrick O'Neal, Joan Hackett, John Gielgud, Herbert Lom, and Oskar Homolka.

Plot
A private detective is hired by an insurance company to investigate a shipping tycoon who is suspected of deliberately sinking his own ships in order to claim the insurance money.

Cast
Patrick O'Neal as Richard Cutting
Joan Hackett as Dominique Laurant
John Gielgud as Curt Valayan
Herbert Lom as Matt Wilson
Eric Portman as Notary
Peter van Eyck as Walter Green
Oskar Homolka as Inspector Ruff
Leon Greene as The Big Man
Kent Smith as Mr. Eversley
Philip Ober as Bohlen
Ann Prentiss as Hotel Party Girl in Red Dress

References

List of American films of 1968

External links

1968 films
1968 drama films
American detective films
Films set in Switzerland
American drama films
Films scored by William Lava
Warner Bros. films
1960s English-language films
1960s American films